Dahu Township is a rural township in the south of Miaoli County, Taiwan.

Geography
As of January 2023, it had 13,210 inhabitants.

Administrative divisions
The township comprises 12 villages: Dahu, Daliao, Danan, Fuxing, Jinghu, Lilin, Minghu, Nanhu, Tungxing, Wurong, Xinkai and Yihe.

Politics
The township is part of Miaoli County Constituency II electoral district for Legislative Yuan.

Economy
The location is famous for strawberry cultivation. The township produces 80% of the total output of strawberry in Taiwan, both in terms of cultivation area and production. Other local crops include: Rosa rugosa, Ginger and Sunflower.

Education
 National Dahu Agricultural & Industrial Vocational High School
 Dahu Junior High School
 Nanhu Junior High School
 Dahu Elementary School

Infrastructures
 Headquarters office of Shei-Pa National Park

Tourist attractions
 Dahu Strawberry Cultural Center
 Shei-Pa National Park

Transportation
Provincial Highway No.3 
Provincial Highway No.6
Provincial Highway No.72: form Houlong to Wenshui

References

External links

  

Townships in Miaoli County